Americo (or Américo) is a Portuguese- and Spanish-language given name, occasionally used as a surname and in other cultures. It is a variant of the name Henry.

English diminutives or hypocorisms include Rico & Eric.

People with the name include:

Arts and entertainment
Américo (born 1977), a Chilean singer
Americo Boschetti (born 1951), a Puerto Rican musician
Américo Castilla, an Argentine artist
Americo Garcia, member of the electronic music duo Boombox Cartel
Américo Hoss (1914–1990), a Hungarian-Argentine cinematographer
Americo Makk (1927–2015), a Hungarian-American artist
Americo Paredes (1915–1999), a Mexican-American author
Americo Sbigoli (died 1822), an Italian singer
Pedro Américo (1843–1905), a Brazilian painter, politician, and scientist

Pseudonyms
Américo Elísio, literary pseudonym of Brazilian statesman and scientist José Bonifácio de Andrada

Politics and government
Américo Boavida (1923–1968), an Angolan physician and activist
Américo Brasiliense de Almeida Melo (1833–1896), a Brazilian politician
Américo António Cuononoca, an Angolan anthropologist and politician
Américo Ghioldi (1899–1985), an Argentine educator and activist
Americo Santiago (born 1951), an American politician
Américo Tomás (1894–1987), a Portuguese naval officer and politician

Sports
Américo Astete (born 1967), an Argentine alpine skier
Américo Bonetti (1928–1999), an Argentine boxer
Américo Fernandes (1899–?), a Brazilian rower
Américo Gallego (born 1955), an Argentine footballer
Américo González (footballer), a Salvadoran footballer
Américo González (pentathlete) (born 1925), an Uruguayan modern pentathlete
Américo Lopes (born 1933), a Portuguese footballer
Américo Montanarini (1917–1994), a Brazilian basketball player
Américo Martins Pereira Júnior (born 1993), a Brazilian footballer
Américo Pereira da Silva, a Portuguese footballer
Américo Rocca (born 1952), a Mexican wrestler
Américo Ruffino (1905–1988), an Argentine footballer
Américo Tesoriere (1899–1977), an Argentine footballer
Ben Bedini (1921–2008), an American baseball player, born Americo Bendini
Edu (footballer, born 1949), a Brazilian footballer, born Jonas Eduardo Américo
Mertz Mortorelli (1921–1985), an American football coach, born Americo Mortorelli
Rick Sapienza (born 1936), an American football player, born Americo Sapienza
Rico Petrocelli (born 1943), an American baseball player, born Americo Petrocelli
Thomas Americo (1958–1999), an East Timorese boxer

Other fields
Américo Amorim (1934–2017), a Portuguese industrialist
Américo Castro (1885–1972), a Spanish cultural historian
Américo Henriques (1923–2006), a Portuguese Catholic bishop

See also

Amalric, a Gothic-language name, including links to related names
Amerigo (disambiguation) 
American (disambiguation)